This is a list of the National Register of Historic Places listings in Barton County, Kansas.

This is intended to be a complete list of the properties on the National Register of Historic Places in Barton County, Kansas, United States.  The locations of National Register properties for which the latitude and longitude coordinates are included below, may be seen in a map.

There are 20 properties listed on the National Register in the county.  Three properties were once listed, but have since been removed.

Current listings

|}

Former listings

|}

See also

 List of National Historic Landmarks in Kansas
 National Register of Historic Places listings in Kansas

References

Barton
National Register of Historic Places in Barton County, Kansas
Buildings and structures in Barton County, Kansas